Bouldin Island is an island in the Sacramento-San Joaquin River Delta,  northwest of Stockton on the Stockton Deepwater Shipping Channel. It is in San Joaquin County, and managed by Reclamation District 756.

Geography

The  island is bounded to the north by South Mokelumne River which separates the island from Staten Island.  To the east, the island is bounded by Little Potato Slough, to the south by Potato Slough, and to the west by the Mokelumne River.

State Route 12 crosses the northern section of Bouldin Island, which is also called Kettleman Lane on the island.

A swing bridge over the Mokelumne River on SR 12 connects the northwestern part of the island to Andrus Island.  Near the northeastern tip of Bouldin Island, a high-level bridge on SR 12 spans Little Potato Slough connecting the island to Stockton, California.

See also
List of islands of California

References

Islands of the Sacramento–San Joaquin River Delta
Islands of Northern California
Islands of San Joaquin County, California
Mokelumne River